Anton Viktorovich Astakhov (born 30 April 1987) is a Russian sports shooter. He competed in the men's skeet event at the 2016 Summer Olympics.

References

External links
 
 

1987 births
Living people
Russian male sport shooters
Olympic shooters of Russia
Shooters at the 2016 Summer Olympics
Sportspeople from Rostov-on-Don
Skeet shooters